Capo d'Orso Lighthouse is an active lighthouse located on the tip of Capo d'Orso promontory in front of the Maddalena archipelago, in the municipality of Palau, in the north east of Sardinia on the Tyrrhenian Sea.

Description
The lighthouse is completely automated and powered by a solar unit and managed by the Marina Militare with the identification code number 1125 E.F.

See also
 List of lighthouses in Italy
 Palau

References

External links
 Servizio Fari Marina Militare

Lighthouses in Italy
Buildings and structures in Sardinia